MS Minyat Samanoud, also known as Minyat Samanoud Youth Center, or simply Minyat Samanoud YC, is an Egyptian football club based in Samanoud, Egypt. The club currently plays in the Egyptian Second Division, the second-highest league in the Egyptian football league system.

Egyptian Second Division
Football clubs in Egypt